The Girl Philippa is a 1917 American silent drama film directed by S. Rankin Drew and starring Anita Stewart. It was produced and released by the Vitagraph Company of America.

Cast

Preservation
With no prints of The Girl Philippa located in any film archives, it is a lost film.

References

External links

1917 films
American silent feature films
Lost American films
American black-and-white films
Vitagraph Studios films
Films directed by S. Rankin Drew
Films based on works by Robert W. Chambers
1910s American films